Cochrane Stadium is a 4,000-seat multi-purpose stadium in Jersey City, New Jersey. Opened in 1983, the stadium is located in the Ed "Faa" Ford Athletic Complex in the Caven Point area of Jersey City near Liberty State Park and Liberty National Golf Club.

In 2008, the stadium's field was re-surfaced with FieldTurf six months after the previous playing surface was found to be contaminated with lead.

Cochrane Stadium (often referred to as Caven Point due to the surrounding area) served as the home for the St. Peter's Peacocks football team until the school folded its program in 2007.

Five Jersey City high schools (two Catholic, three public) currently share Cochrane Stadium. They are:

St. Peter's Preparatory School
Hudson Catholic High School
James J. Ferris High School
Lincoln High School
Henry Snyder High School

References

Sports venues completed in 1990
Saint Peter's Peacocks football
College football venues
Sports venues in New Jersey
Multi-purpose stadiums in the United States
Major League Rugby stadiums
Sports in Hudson County, New Jersey
Buildings and structures in Jersey City, New Jersey
Rugby league stadiums in the United States
Rugby union stadiums in the United States
High school football venues in the United States
1990 establishments in New Jersey
American football venues in New Jersey
Defunct college football venues
Soccer venues in New Jersey